Hugo Rodrigues Imbelloni, the Hugo (Itaperuna, August 21, 1983) is a Brazilian footballer who plays for Tupi as midfielder.

Career
Hugo started his career in the youth of the International. He then spent Tupi by 2004, Botafogo de Ribeirão Preto 2005, CENE 2006, Win 2006 and Juventus in 2007. In 2008, he returned to the team of Juiz de Fora and after a great championship miner, was hired by Atlético Mineiro and subsequently loaned to Sport. In the 2010 season will return to Atlético Mineiro.

In 2010 played in the Goiás on loan from Atlético Mineiro.

Career statistics
(Correct )

Honours
Juventus
Copa Federação Paulista: 2007

Contract
 Goiás.

References

External links
 ogol
 soccerway

1983 births
Living people
Brazilian footballers
Clube Atlético Mineiro players
Goiás Esporte Clube players
Ituano FC players
Tupi Football Club players
Association football midfielders
People from Itaperuna